Zianchurinsky District (Yeyänsura rayonı) is an administrative and municipal district (raion), one of the fifty-four in the Republic of Bashkortostan, Russia. It is located in the south of the republic and borders with Kugarchinsky District in the north, Zilairsky District in the northeast and east, Khaybullinsky District in the east, and with Orenburg Oblast in the south and west. Its administrative center is the rural locality (a selo) of Isyangulovo. As of the 2010 Census, the total population of the district was 27,626, with the population of Isyangulovo accounting for 26.9% of that number.

History
The district was established on August 20, 1930.

Administrative and municipal status
Within the framework of administrative divisions, Zianchurinsky District is one of the fifty-four in the Republic of Bashkortostan. The district is divided into fifteen selsoviets, comprising seventy-eight rural localities. As a municipal division, the district is incorporated as Zianchurinsky Municipal District. Its fifteen selsoviets are incorporated as fifteen rural settlements within the municipal district. The selo of Isyangulovo serves as the administrative center of both the administrative and municipal district.

References

Notes

Sources

Districts of Bashkortostan
States and territories established in 1930